Amir Gutfreund (July 23, 1963 - November 27, 2015) was an Israeli writer and columnist for the Maariv newspaper.

Books
2000:  (novel, translated into  German, English, French, Czech and Hungarian)
2002: אחוזות החוף Ahuzot HaHof or The Shoreline Mansions (short story collection)
2005:העולם, קצת אחר כך The World, a Little Later (novel) 
 In English: The World a Moment Later (translated by Jessica Cohen, Toby Press)
2008: בשבילה גיבורים עפים Heroes Fly to Her / When Heroes Fly (novel)
2013: מזל עורב Crow
2014: אגדת ברונו ואדלה (Agadát Bruno VeAdela), The Legend of Bruno and Adela
2016: הר האושר Mount of Happiness / Mount of Beatitudes (unfinished, posthumous)

Awards
2001:  for Our Holocaust
2003:  Sapir Prize for  Ahuzot HaHof
2009: Jewish Quarterly-Wingate Prize for The World a Moment Later
2015:  for The Legend of Bruno and Adela

Influence
 When Heroes Fly,  Israeli drama TV series based on the novel  Heroes Fly to Her. The series won Best Series at the first Canneseries Festival in April 2018.
Echo 3, an English-language TV series based on the Israeli series 
The Matchmaker (2010 film) (lit. "Once I Was", Once Upon a Time I Was), inspired by the novel When Heroes Fly

References

1963 births
2015 deaths
Israeli writers
Israeli columnists